= Siege of Bayeux =

Siege of Bayeux may refer to:

- Siege of Bayeux (1106), the siege and capture of the town by King Henry I of England
- Siege of Bayeux (1417), the siege and capture of the town by the English during the Hundred Years' War
- Siege of Bayeux (1450), the siege and capture of the town by the French during the Hundred Years' War
